This is a list of characters in Kirakira Pretty Cure a la Mode, a 2017 Japanese magical girl anime series produced by Asahi Broadcasting Corporation, Toei Animation, and the fourteenth installment in Izumi Todo's Pretty Cure metaseries.

Main characters

Kirakira Pretty Cures
 

The main protagonist, a confident 13-year-old second year middle school student who wishes to become a pastry chef when she grows up. Very cheerful and energetic as a rabbit, she loves sweets and desserts but struggles with actually making them as perfect or good as possible. Her mother works overseas as a doctor, leaving her father who runs a Dojo as her caretaker until she returns home. Though her baking skills are not perfect, her determination and heart were in the right place, which fueled her resolve in becoming a Pretty Cure. As Cure Whip, she is the Pretty Cure of cheerfulness and smiles, sporting a rabbit and strawberry shortcake motif. She uses her Rabbit-like instincts for enhanced hearing and powerful jumping ability. Also, she utilizes her Sweets Pact as a weapon, using the wand to create a pink cream lasso to attack or grapple enemies. She later uses the Candy Rod to perform her new attack, Whip Decoration, in episode 12. Her Animal Sweet is the Rabbit Shortcake. At the end of the series, she now travels around the world with KiraPati to make others smile. Her theme color is pink.
She issued a greeting to the Japanese chapter of Médecins Sans Frontières in November 2017.

 
 
A 14-year-old classmate of Ichika, she is a hard-working second year middle school student. She is shown to be shy yet very knowledgeable, sometimes been known to be fast and light as a Squirrel. While working on the shop, she is very knowledgeable about sweets and pastries, often being referred to as a "Sweets Professor". As Cure Custard, she is the Pretty Cure of intelligence and courage, spotting a squirrel and pudding motif. Her squirrel abilities allow her to use lightning-like abilities and superspeed to make her run extremely fast. Her upgraded attack is Custard Illusion when using the Candy Rod. Her Animal Sweet is the Squirrel Pudding. At the end of the series, she is now working as a Sweets Scientist on creating a large Pudding with other food scientists. Her theme color is yellow.

 

A 14-year-old second year middle school student and another classmate of Ichika, who is known to be enthusiastic and brave like a lion. She is a lead vocalist of Wild Azur, a rock band and loves to sing. When managing the shop, her strength comes in handy as well as her support. It is later revealed that she is an heiress to the Tategami family's immense wealth. As Cure Gelato, she is the Pretty Cure of freedom and passion, sporting a lion and ice cream motif. Her lion abilities allow her to use ice powers and lion's roar to freeze the enemy. Her upgraded attack is Gelato Shake when using the Candy Rod. Her Animal Sweet is the Lion Ice Cream. At the end of the series, she is now a world-famous singer. Her theme color is blue.

 

A 17-year-old noble second-year high school student who is known for her beauty, but can be quite selfish and arrogant at times like a cat. Though a bit intimidating, she only uses her skills in the shop when bored. But when with Ichika's support, she then starts to enjoy her job and now supports the group. As Cure Macaron, she is the Pretty Cure of beauty and excitement, sporting a cat and a macaron motif with elements from  actresses of Takarazuka Revue. Her cat-like abilities allow her to have better reflexes in battle, making her more nimble. Her upgraded attack is the Macaron Julien when using the Candy Rod. Her Animal Sweet is the Cat Macaron. At the end of the series, she appears to be travelling around the world. Her theme color is purple.

 

A 17-year-old gentle second-year high school student who has a boyish appearance that is unknown to others why. She is very nice and a strong sense of justice like a loyal dog, often being a good person to rely on. Akira has knowledge on places and has a sick younger sister named Miku who she tends to cheer up and is very protective of, as shown when Julio steals Miku's kirakiraru. She moved to Ichika's neighborhood in order to be closer to the hospital her sister stays at. As Cure Chocolat, she is the Pretty Cure of strength and love, sporting a dog and chocolate motif with elements from  actresses of Takarazuka Revue. Her dog-like abilities allows her to have a better sense of smell in battle, making her more sensitive. Her upgraded attack is Chocolate Aromase when using the Candy Rod which sometimes turns into a chocolate sword. Her Animal Sweet is the Dog Chocolate. At the end of the series, she is currently studying as a nurse. Her theme color is red.

  

A rabbit-like fairy who is able to transform into a human. She became known as the Genius Patissiere after studying in France and recently returned to Japan for a demonstration. It is later revealed that she is Julio's older twin sister, who was able to transform into a human after studying baking for a while, however, she reverts to her fairy form whenever she gets too hungry. As Cure Parfait, she is the Pretty Cure of dreams and hope, spotting a pegasus and parfait motif. Her attacks include Parfait Etoile and KiraKuru Rainbow, the latter being used to purify monsters. Both of these attacks require the Rainbow Ribbon. Her Animal Sweet is the Pegasus Parfait. At the end of the series, she and Pikario work together in creating sweets. Her theme color is green with rainbow as a sub-colour.

Fairies 
 

A chubby and spoiled puppy-like fairy who loves sweets and resides at Mount Ichigo. The color of her ears changes based on her emotions (e.g. Pink if she is happy and blue if she is sad). In later episodes, she gained the ability to turn into a small human girl, which she uses to assist the main girls. In Episode 47, after Ichika and the others were drained of their Kirakiraru, she gained the potential to become the group's seventh member, obtaining her own Sweets Pact and Animal Sweet. As Cure Pekorin, she is the Pretty Cure of Taste and Sparkles, sporting a doughnuts and lamb motif. Her attacks include firing cream-like projectiles using the Candy Rod, which explodes in certain time. Her Animal Sweet is the Pekorin Doughnut and her theme color is pink. At the end of the series, she now runs PekoPati with Elder, working hard in making sweets.

An elderly goat-like fairy who resides at Mount Ichigo. He takes the form of a spirit following the cream explosion and entrusted the protection of kirakiral to the Cures. He can also assume a human form that looks like an elderly man, acting as the shop's owner.

They are some of the fairies who live on Mount Ichigo. They really like the Pretty Cures. After Mount Ichigo was hit by the cream explosion caused by the evil fairies, they found themselves scattered across the world, but thanks to the Elder, Gummy and his gang gather back on Mount Ichigo.

Antagonists 

The main antagonist of the series, a demon who wears a mask and a robe. A century before the events of the series, due to his inability to make sweets, Noir demanded Lumière bake only for him. Her refusal resulted in Noir vowing to stai the town in darkness, using his powers to stain the kirakiral of a person's heart and turn them into objects to take others' kirakiral. While he possesses Elysio to confront the Cures, Noir ends up being betrayed by his vessel when his past is revealed and the Cures attempt to reach him. He gets turned into a card alongside Lumière for Elysio's own agenda.

A charismatic yet nihilistic man who serves as Noir's vessel, considering himself as a hollow shell while serving as the secondary antagonist of the series. He always carries tarot cards, using them in a variety of ways from absorbing kirakiral to weapons and a method of mind control. He mostly researches the Cures for their weaknesses before planning out an attack. After sealing Grave and Diable within cards, he can tap into their power to assume different appearances to fight the Cures. While allowing Noir to possess him to fight the Cures,  Elysio deems Noir's motives ridiculous as he seals both the spirit and Lumière into cards so he can use their powers to turn Ichigoazaka into pastel-colored place devoid of emotions while attempting to prevent the Cures from interfering via memory alteration. But when the Cures overwhelmed him despite using Noir and Lumière's powers, Elysio sucked them and the planet into his body as a last resort. But the Cures open Elysio's eyes by revealing that he possesses a heart, convincing him to help them restore the world. Elysio relinquishes Noir and Lumière's cards to the girls before taking his leave to see the world.

A group of evil and mischievous fairies who are the first antagonists of the series, their goal is to steal kirakiral from the sweet foods and desserts to gain power. All members usually absorb the kirakiral from the sweets they set on, becoming a more monstrous form of their normal selves. Depending which members absorbed from different types of sweets, their body parts will also grow and have a sweets-like appearance. They all wear red belts with black star symbols on their buckles. When defeated, they will revert to their normal form, each of their forms speaks in a different voice. Each member's name are named after sweets and comes from the taste.
 is a tempering dark purple lizard-like fairy who is the leader of the Kirakiral Thieves, a group of ten fairies bewitched by the belts Juilo gave them while instilling the notion in them to gain power by stealing kirakiral from pastries. Each member targets a different type of pastry, like Gummy going after cakes, absorbing the kirakiral to become monstrous versions of themselves which the Pretty Cure team defeat. When the Kirakiral Thieves all attack the sweets festival, they were combined into a powerful version of Gummy by Julio to overpower the Cures. But the thieves were restored by the Candy Rod while freed from Julio's influence, the group later apologizing for their actions.
 is a cunning yellow frog-like fairy who is seeking for kirakiral in puddings. He nearly defeats Cure Whip before Cure Custard joins in and they defeat him. His body part in his larger form is puddings.
 is a hot-blooded and cool-headed red weasel-like fairy who tracks down kirakiral in ice creams. He attempts to battle Cure Whip and Cure Custard but only to be beaten by Cure Gelato. His body part in his larger form is ice creams.
 is a lazy and greedy black duck-like fairy who is looking for kirakiral in cream puffs. He tries to steal the kirakiral from the cream puffs made by the Cures but he was defeated by the effort of the Cures. His body part in his larger form is cream puffs and has an elephant trunk.
 is a cruel and spoiled green doll-like fairy wearing a necklace who is finding the kirakiral in macarons. She tried to fight the Cures until being defeated by Cure Macaron. Her body part in her larger form is macarons and she can use her tongue as weapon.
 is a stubborn brown pterodactyl-like fairy who desiring kirakiral in chocolates. He successfully took kirakiral from Akira's chocolate. During their second encounter, he easily beat the other Cures but could not take on Cure Chocolat and beaten. His body part in his larger form is chocolates.
 is an outgoing yellow monkey-like fairy carrying a floating donut who wants kirakiral in doughnuts. He uses his duplication powers against Cure Whip but was defeated by the combined strengths of the Cures. His body part in his larger form is doughnuts and the body become orange and his floating doughnut become more reddish.
 is a prideful and proud brown noodle-like fairy with a demonic appearance who needs kirakiral in sponge cakes. He took kirakiral from Emiru's cake, he almost win until the Cures unites their strengths to defeat him. His body part in his larger form is sponge cakes and can use his arms as a whip.
 is a hulking and strong brown dog-like fairy who is hunting kirakiral in cookies. He targets Tatsumi's Panda Cookie until the Cures intervened and drives him away. His body part in his larger form is cookies and has many shapes around his body.

 / 

Originally a rabbit-like fairy, Pikario is Kirarin's younger twin brother who fell into a depression as he couldn't match Kirarin's skills. As a result, he grew to hate sweets and was transformed into the human Julio by Noir by taking the kirakiral from his heart. However, any sweet Pikario would make from then on would be stained in darkness. The taken kirakiral was then transformed into a black rod he can transform into any type of weapon depending on the type of sweet that absorbed kirakiral originated from. Revealed to be the one who influenced the Kirakiral Thieves into being evil, Julio assumes the identity of a transfer student named  to spy on the Cures team as Ichika's classmate. He discovered the Cures' identities during their second confrontation. He believes that all his intention are part of his experiment. After being exposed by Yukari when she discovered that he had been gathering information about the Cures, Ciel revealed her brother's true identity before he is restored by the Cures. When Noir attempts to kill Ciel, Pikario sacrifices himself for his sister so she can complete her parfait while giving her his rod as it transformed into the Rainbow Ribbon. He eventually recovered in the shrine, coming to help the Cures battle Grave.

A girl who takes over after Julio loses to the Cures, Bibury was originally a lonely orphan whom Noir recruited while extracting her kirakiral and corrupted it into a Kirakiral-absorbing doll called  which Bibury carries around with her. Following Julio's defeat, Bibury first made herself know in an attempt to sabotage Kirakira Patisserie with ugly yet foolish rumors before being foiled by Yukari and her fangirls. While Iru serves as her enforcer once absorbing enough kirakiral to increase its size until defeated, Bibury can merge into her doll to increase its power. When she confronts the Cures to in a final attempt to redeem herself before Noir, Bibury ends being sent back in time with them to Ichizoka's past and learned that Noir engineered her solitude to recruit her. Iru then forcefully absorbs a conflicted Bibury to attack the Cures, who defeat the doll as it dissolves back into Bibury's kirakiral energies. Bibury later begins working at Ciel's patisserie, supporting the Cures.

A fierce man with a blonde hair who owns a purple car that can absorb kirakiral, able to create clay doll minions called  which he can turn into monsters based on the kirakiral that his car absorbs. Glaive later has his car absorb the essence of a dying Diable, transforming it into a stronger  car. He then attacks Ichigoza by converting its denizens into Nendos, later merging with his car to fight the Cures until they defeat him with Sweets Castle. Glaive is turned into a card by Elysio. Glaive was revived after Elysio turned Ichigozaka into his domain, now military garb with the task of quickly exacting any kirakiral that manifests to maintain Elysio's ideal order and keep the Cures from regaining their memories. But Pekorin intervened and defeated Glaive while restoring the Cures' memories.

A wolf-like spirit who was an old ally of Noir before he was defeated by Lumière in the past, seeking to gather enough kirakiral to fully revive. In episode 36, he fully assumes his true form, and battles the Cures, only to be defeated, with Glaive absorbing the dying being into his car. After Glaive's defeat, Diable's essence is turned into a card by Elysio.

Cures' families 

Ichika's father who runs a family-owned dojo. He is very good at martial arts and knows his daughter's feelings.

Ichika's mother who works as a doctor overseas. She often comes home to Japan to give Ichika sweets she bought.

Aoi's father who's the president of the Tategami Konzern. He would like his daughter to respect his social status more, but after attending one of his concerts and seeing how much he wants to pursue a career as a rock singer, he decides to entrust the future command of his financial group to the faithful Mizushima.

Aoi's mother who's attending a concert of her daughter with her band, she agrees with her husband to entrust the leadership of the family financial group to Mizushima and thus allow Aoi to continue being a rock singer.

Yukari's grandmother.

Akira's grandmother.

Akira's younger sister who is hospitalized for an unknown illness.

Others
 / 

A legendary Patissiere the Cures encounter while traveling back in time, later revealed to be a nemesis of Noir from a century ago.

A quartet of classmates at Ichigozaka School. Junko is kind of laid-back; Risa is bright and cheery; Wataru is good at sports; Hiroki is described as a lively mood maker.

Schoolmates who are members of Wild Azur, a band Aoi leads.

A rock vocalist who Aoi admires. She is in a band called Ganache.

 The daughter of the shopkeeper of the Sugar sweets shop.  She wears her hair in a bun. She is known as the Madonna of the Ichigozaka shopping district.

 A cat that frequents the patisserie shops. He has dark fur with a white chest and three white stars on his forehead. He is said to bring good luck to a shop that he visits. He does not allow anyone to pet him except Yukari.

 An elementary school student who visits the patisserie. She has short brown hair and wears a beret. She is from Ichigozaka.

 He wears a red jacket, a green shirt, blue jeans, and a baseball cap. He also visits the patisserie.

 A nursery school teacher at Ichigozaka. She has shoulder-length brown hair and wears glasses.

 The chief butler of Tategami Konzern.

 A little girl who Akira met during the school festival.

 A Prince from the Duchy of Confeito. He claims to have fallen for Yukari at first sight and sees Akira as a rival for her affection, unaware that Akira is actually a girl.

 & 

 The participants from the audition.

 The writer of Himari's favourite book.

 She is the owner of the Mon Tresor pastry shop in Paris, as well as the one who discovered and valued Ciel's talent for sweets. When she discovers that Ciel is in Ichigozaka, she is curious to know why her pupil has chosen to leave the excellent reputation she enjoys in Paris for a small town in the hills and does everything to bring her back with him. She later understands that the girl has made solid friendships on the spot, with whom he wishes to continue discovering new things, and desists from his intent.

 

 A pink-colored Pretty Cure from Hug! Pretty Cure.

 A mysterious baby from Hug! Pretty Cure.

Movie characters

A pâtissier who taught Kirarin how to make sweets in Paris. He is passionate for making sweets but something seems to have changed about him.

The main antagonist of the film. A doll-like fairy who always seems to be seen together with Jean-Pierre. She influences Jean to creates the "Ultimate Sweets" to transform the city into sweets for revenge. She tricks Jean to merge with the sweets and convert everything into sweets. When the Cures reason with Jean, Cook fuses herself with the sweet monster but the Cures defeat her with Animal Memoir. Cook is turned into a human who becomes Jean's apprentice.

References

Pretty Cure
Lists of anime and manga characters
Magical girl anime and manga characters